La estación de la Calle Olvera (English: The Olvera Street Station) is a 2008 American drama television film directed by Pablo Garcia. It first aired on Discovery Channel in the United States and the film was released on September 14, 2008.

Cast
 Maria-Elena Laas as Catrina
 Becky G as Nina (credited as Becky Gomez)
 Juan Miguel Guerrero as Jose
 Tom Wade as Mr. Weiss
 Blanca Caras
 Jed Turman
 Lazaro Arvizu as Aztec Dancer 1
 Esteban Coronado as Aztec Dancer 2
 Leandro Guerrero as Aztec Dancer 3

External links
 

2008 television films
2008 films
2000s Spanish-language films
2008 drama films
American drama television films
2000s English-language films
Spanish-language American films
2008 multilingual films
American multilingual films
2000s American films